F11 and Be There is a 2020 documentary film by Jethro Waters about Magnum Photos and Life Magazine photographer Burk Uzzle. Produced, directed, filmed, and edited by Waters, F11 and Be There explores civil rights, race, social justice, and art through Uzzle's 65+ year legacy, as well as his continuing work focusing on African Americans in the South. Uzzle is well known for his photographs of the Civil Rights Movement of the 1960s, the funeral of Martin Luther King Jr., as well as his iconic picture of Woodstock which later became the cover of the official Woodstock album. The original score for the film was composed and performed by Natalie Prass and Eric Slick, with animations by Cable Hardin.

Release and accolades

Release
F11 and Be There was first released in the United States on October 25, 2018 at the Austin Film Festival. A shortened 55 minute version of the film was released on television through PBS and UNCTV as the premiere episode of the southern documentary series Reel South on April 6, 2020. The full-length feature film was released in select theaters and streaming services across the United States on Oct 9, 2020.

Awards
 Won Midsouth Emmy Awards for Best Documentary - Cultural (2020)
 Won Impact Docs Awards Award of Excellence Special Mention (2020)
 Official Selection, 2018 Austin Film Festival
 Official Selection, 2019 Full Frame Documentary Film Festival
 Official Selection, 2019 RiverRun Film Festival
 Official Selection, 2019 Oaxaca FilmFest

References

2020 documentary films